

Historical and architectural interest bridges

Major bridges

Notes and references 
 

 Others references

See also 

 Transport in Cambodia
 Rail transport in Cambodia
 List of crossings of the Mekong River
 Geography of Cambodia

External links 

 
 
 

Cambodia
 
Bridges
Bridges